Confide in Me: The Irresistible Kylie is a compilation album by Australian singer Kylie Minogue. It was released by Music Club on 16 July 2007 in the United Kingdom. The album contains every song from Minogue's two Deconstruction Records albums Kylie Minogue (1994) and Impossible Princess (1997), as well as rare songs and B-sides.

Track listing

References

External links
Kylie.com – official website.

2007 greatest hits albums
Kylie Minogue compilation albums
Contemporary R&B compilation albums
Electronica compilation albums
Trip hop compilation albums